École d'ingénieurs ENSIL-ENSCI (formerly École nationale supérieure d'ingénieurs de Limoges and École nationale supérieure de céramique industrielle) a French engineering College created in 1893.

The school trains engineers in ceramics, materials, water engineering and environment, electronics and telecommunications, mechatronics.

Located in Limoges, the ENSIL-ENSCI is a public higher education institution. The school is a member of the University of Limoges.

Notable alumni 
 Charles Catteau, a French Art Déco industrial designer

References

External links
 ENSIL-ENSCI

Engineering universities and colleges in France
ENSIL-ENSCI
Limoges
Educational institutions established in 1893
1893 establishments in France